Sarah Norcliffe Cleghorn (February 4, 1876 – April 4, 1959) was an educator, author, social reformer and poet whose work was associated with the American Naturalist literary movement.

Early years

Born in Norfolk, Virginia, Cleghorn spent her early childhood in Wisconsin and Minnesota, then moved to Manchester, Vermont after the death of her mother to live with her father's sisters. Although she regularly traveled and was tenured both with the Brookwood Labor College and the Manumit School, Cleghorn is largely associated with Manchester, which was her primary home. She graduated from Burr and Burton Seminary in Manchester, Vermont in 1895 then spent a year at Radcliffe College. During her early years in southern Vermont, Cleghorn came to know Dorothy Canfield Fisher, who also became a noted writer and educator. The two women maintained a close relationship throughout their lifetimes and collaborated on several books.

Writer and social reformer

Cleghorn's poetry is largely didactic in nature, serving to illustrate Christian Socialist values and progressive political and social principles. Her early work was published in the Atlantic Monthly, Harpers, The American Magazine, and others. Cleghorn was involved in various reform movements such as anti-vivisection, vegetarianism, pacifism and opposition to capital punishment and lynching. In 1913, she joined Socialist Party of America. Some of her later work was published in The Masses, The Survey, and The World Tomorrow. Her most widely known poem "The Golf Links" is an ironic and satirical look at child labor. It first appeared in F.P.A.'s column in the New-York Tribune.

The golf links lie so near the mill
That almost every day
The laboring children can look out
And see the men at play.

Cleghorn was a Quaker pacifist. She supported animal rights and opposed vivisection. She was a vegetarian and condemned animal experiments, fishing and hunting. Her book The Seamless Robe: The Religion of Lovingkindness advocated Christian vegetarianism with compassion and love to both animals and humans.

Works and publications

 With Dorothy Canfield Fisher

 With Dorothy Canfield Fisher

References

External links
 
 Inventory of Sarah Norcliffe Cleghorn Papers, Special Collections, University of Vermont Library
 
 

1876 births
1959 deaths
20th-century American poets
20th-century American women
American animal rights activists
American Christian socialists
American Quakers
American vegetarianism activists
American women poets
Anti-vivisectionists
Christian vegetarianism
People from Manchester, Vermont
Poets from Wisconsin
American social reformers